The Roman Catholic Archdiocese of Nassau is an archdiocese of the Latin Church of the Catholic Church in the Caribbean. The archdiocese encompasses the islands of the former British dependency of the Bahamas. The archbishop is the metropolitan responsible for the suffragan diocese of Diocese of Hamilton in Bermuda and the Mission sui iuris of Turks and Caicos, and is a member of the Antilles Episcopal Conference.

The first permanent Roman Catholic presence in the Bahamas was established in 1885 by the Archdiocese of New York given its trade connections. The archdiocese was originally erected as the Prefecture Apostolic of the Bahama in March 1929, and was no longer associated with New York by 1932. The diocese was subsequently elevated to the Vicariate Apostolic of the Bahama Islands in January 1941, and then to a full diocese, as the diocese of Nassau, in June 1960. On June 22, 1999, the diocese was again elevated as the new Archdiocese of Nassau.

As of 2004, the archdiocese contains 30 parishes, 15 active diocesan priests, 14 religious priests, and 48,000 Catholics.  It also has 28 Women Religious, 14 Religious Brothers, and 13 permanent deacons.

Bishops

Ordinaries

John Bernard Kevenhoerster O.S.B. (1931–1949)
Paul Leonard Hagarty O.S.B. (1950–1981)
Lawrence Aloysius Burke, S.J. (1981–2004), appointed Archbishop of Kingston in Jamaica
Patrick Christopher Pinder (2004–present)

Auxiliary bishop
Patrick Christopher Pinder (2003–2004), appointed Archbishop here

References
Archdiocese of Nassau page at catholichierarchy.org retrieved July 18, 2006

Roman Catholic dioceses in the Caribbean
Catholic Church in the Bahamas
A